George Digby may refer to:
George Digby, 2nd Earl of Bristol (1612–1677), English politician
George Digby Barker (1833–1914), British soldier and colonial administrator
George Digby Morant (1837–1921), British admiral
George Digby (baseball scout) (1917–2014), American scout and consultant in Major League Baseball